William, Willie or Billy Dunn may refer to:

Politics
 Sir William Dunn, 1st Baronet, of Lakenheath (1833–1912), banker and Liberal MP for Paisley
 Sir William Dunn, 1st Baronet, of Clitheroe (1856–1926), British Conservative politician
 William Dunn (South Australian politician) (1841–1891)
 William E. Dunn (born 1926), mayor of Murray, Utah
 William McKee Dunn (1814–1887), U.S. Representative from Indiana

Sports
 William Dunn (bobsleigh) (born 1949), Canadian Olympic bobsledder
 William Dunn (footballer, born 1877) (1877–?), English footballer, played for Manchester United
 William Thomas Dunn (1881–1962), American football player for Penn State
 Willie Dunn (golfer) (died 1952), English golfer and golf course designer
 Willie Dunn Sr. (1821–1878), Scottish golfer
 Billy Dunn (footballer, born 1865) (1865–1921), Scottish footballer with Stoke and other clubs
 Billy Dunn (footballer, born 1910) (1910–1980), Scottish footballer with Celtic, Brentford, Southampton
 Billy Dunn (footballer, born 1920) (1920–1982), English footballer with Darlington

Other
 William Dunn (industrialist) (1770–1849), Scottish agriculturist, mechanic, and mill owner
 William Dunn (Medal of Honor) (1834–1902), American Civil War sailor
 William Dunn (physician) (c. 1550–1607), president of Royal College of Physicians, see Lumleian Lectures
 William Arthur Dunn (1875–1947), Methodist clergyman in South Australia
 William Ellsworth Dunn (1861–1925), city attorney of Los Angeles, California
 William N. Dunn, American professor of international relations at the University of Pittsburgh
 William R. Dunn (actor) (1888–1946), American film actor and writer
 William R. Dunn (aviator) (1916–1995), American World War II fighter pilot
 Sir William Dunn Professor of Biochemistry, chair at the University of Cambridge (created 1914)
 Willie Dunn (1942–2013), Canadian singer-songwriter, film director, and politician

See also
 Bill Dunn (disambiguation)
 Dunn (surname)
 Dunn baronets, three British baronetcies with incumbents named William Dunn
 William Donne (cricketer) (1875–1934), English cricketer
 William Donne (priest) (1845–1914), British clergyman
 William Bodham Donne (1807–1882), English journalist